The USCGC North Star was a United States Coast Guard Cutter during the Second World War. It was originally built for the U.S. Interior Department and served in the United States Coast Guard (USCG) before being acquired by the U.S. Navy.

History
The North Star was built in 1932 by Berg Shipbuilding Company in Seattle, Washington as a wooden cutter for the U.S. Department of the Interior and was commissioned by the Interior Department in 1932. She served as a support ship during the United States Antarctic Service Expedition from 1939 to 1941. She transported the unique Antarctic Snow Cruiser for the expedition and evacuated members of the expedition upon its conclusion early in 1941.

She was commissioned as the USCGC North Star (WPG-59) on 15 May 1941 and served on the Northeast Greenland Patrol starting on 1 July 1941. Although the United States was not yet at war, the Navy was providing convoy escorts to protect American shipping in the North Atlantic from attacks by German U-boats. The Northeast Greenland Patrol, was organized at Boston and consisted of Coast Guard cutters  and the venerable , as well as the North Star. The duties of the Greenland Patrol were varied - protecting convoy routes; ice breaking and passages were found through it for the Greenland convoys; escorting merchant ship; rescuing survivors of submarine attacks; construction and maintenance of aids to navigation; reporting of weather and ice conditions; and conducting air and surface patrols.

North Star was involved with the capture, on 12 September 1941, of the supposedly neutral Norwegian trawler Buskoe, which was, in fact, serving the Germans by supporting German radio and weather stations in Greenland. The captured trawler and her crew and passengers were transported to Boston by Bear for internment.  With the official entry of the United States into the war on 8 December 1941, North Star continued her service with the Greenland Patrol. She was especially useful in supporting east Greenland stations between 13 August and 23 September 1942. She was attacked by a German reconnaissance aircraft north of Jan Mayen Island on 23 July 1943. The plane withdrew from the engagement and trailed heavy black smoke as it disappeared over the horizon. North Star also investigated a German outpost at Sabine Island, East Greenland on 31 August.

North Star was reclassified as IX-148 (Miscellaneous Unclassified) on 15 December 1943 and was decommissioned by the U.S. Coast Guard on 13 January 1944. She was transferred to the US Navy on 15 January and placed in reduced commission. She was decommissioned on 15 June 1945 at Seattle and returned to the Department of the Interior on 18 June 1945. She was struck from the U.S. Naval Register on 11 July 1945.

Awards
United States Antarctic Expedition Medal
American Defense Service Medal with "A" device
American Campaign Medal
European-African-Middle Eastern Campaign Medal
World War II Victory Medal

See also

References

1932 ships
Ships built in Seattle
Icebreakers of the United States Coast Guard